"This Ladder Is Ours" is a song by the Welsh alternative rock band the Joy Formidable, taken from the group's second album, Wolf's Law.

Music video
An official music video for the song, directed by Greg Jardin, was released on 8 November 2012. Commenting on the concept of the video, Jardin stated, "I wanted the video to essentially be just like the song and band itself – aggressive but also ethereal. That notion, and the band’s recurring visual theme of the wilderness, inspired the idea of the band performing in some sort of elemental battle between man and nature; and thus, the idea for the dust storm was conceived."

Track listings
Digital download
This Ladder Is Ours - 5:11
Cholla - 3:24

Charts

References

2012 singles
The Joy Formidable songs
2012 songs
Atlantic Records singles